Epipagis forsythae, or Forsyth's epipagis moth, is a moth in the family Crambidae. It was described by Eugene G. Munroe in 1955. It is found in North America, where it has been recorded from Florida.

References

Moths described in 1955
Spilomelinae